Cesare Uva (November 11, 1824 – February 16, 1886) was an Italian painter.

He was born in Avellino, resident in Naples. He initially frequented the studio of Gabriele Smargiassi and then the Academy of Fine Arts of Naples.

He painted landscapes, Pompeian (Ancient Roman) themes, and genre paintings, which he exhibited in Italy and elsewhere. Among his works are The Last Day of Pompei and The Waters of the Serino, exhibited in Naples in 1877. In 1883 he exhibited the following oil canvases: Sunset and The Return from the Festival; in tempera: A Forest in Spring. He died in Naples.

References

1824 births
1886 deaths
People from Avellino
19th-century Italian painters
Italian male painters
Painters from Naples
Neo-Pompeian painters
19th-century Italian male artists